Halyzia sedecimguttata, or orange ladybird, is a species of Coccinellidae (ladybirds) family.

Distribution
Halyzia sedecimguttata is common in Europe, European Russia, the Caucasus, Siberia, the Russian Far East, Belarus, Ukraine, Transcaucasia, Kazakhstan, Asia Minor, Mongolia, Northern China, Japan.

It was formerly uncommon in the British Isles but the species has established itself over the 20th-century and it is now common in many parts.

Habitat
Common in woodlands, it is more frequent in dry areas, mainly in deciduous woodland (Western European broadleaf forests, Palearctic temperate broadleaf and mixed forest) and in parkland, at forest edges, and on hedges.

Description
These beetles have an oval shaped body, rather round than elongated. Compound eyes are black. The antennae are light-brown, quite long and slightly thickened at the end. Their physical appearance is marked by a striking orange colour and the presence of 16 (sometimes less) creamy white large spots on the elytra (eight spots on each elytron). The neck shield usually covers the head and shows orange colored spots. A typical feature is the slightly transparent edges of the elytra. Transparent parts are also present on either side of the neck shield.

This species is rather similar to Calvia decemguttata and Vibidia duodecimguttata.

Biology
Adults are visible from April to October. They spend the winter under the bark of the trees or in the forest litter under fallen leave. Both larvae and adults feed on mildew that infects the leaves of plants and occasionally on small aphids. They mainly feed on Erisyphaceae infesting trees and bushes. In particular, they feed on Phyllactinia guttata and Podosphaera mors-uvae  and on aphids present on Quercus robur, Tilia cordata, Ulmus minor, Acer pseudoplatanus, Corylus avellana, Fraxinus excelsior, Alnus viridis, Alnus glutinosa and on coniferous trees.

Gallery

References

External links
  Ladybird Survey Northern Ireland 2005

Coccinellidae
Beetles described in 1758
Beetles of Asia
Beetles of Europe
Taxa named by Carl Linnaeus
Articles containing video clips